Panay Technological College is a higher institution in Kalibo, Aklan.

References

Universities and colleges in Aklan